Anno Online was a free-to-play strategy browser game by Ubisoft. It was a spin-off of the Anno series. The players could develop and manage island braced cities from the first settlers to commercial empires.

English closed beta started on 23 April 2013, and open beta started on 14 May. Beta status ended on 25 September. The game was in "maintenance mode" starting in September 2017, meaning there was no further development or major in-game events. The game was closed on 31 January 2018.

References

External links
 UK Official "Anno Online" Website
 Official "Anno Online" website (US English)
 Official "Anno Online" website 

2013 video games
Anno (series)
Strategy games
Browser games
Free-to-play video games
Ubisoft games
Blue Byte games
Video games developed in Germany